Hodkin is a surname. Notable people with the surname include:

Ernest Hodkin (1890–1967), English football player
Michelle Hodkin (born 1982), American author

See also
Hodgkin